Thornridge High School is a public four-year high school located in Dolton, Illinois, a suburb about 20 miles south of Chicago. The school is part of Thornton Township High School District 205. Thornridge High School first opened to the public in 1960 after completing construction of the current main building. It serves the cities and villages of Dolton, Harvey, South Holland, Phoenix, Burnham, Calumet City, and Markham.

Academics 
The total student attendance in is 94%. School graduation rate is 73.1%. Thornridge was ranked a commendable school according to the US News & World Report.

Demographics 
The racial makeup of Thornridge consists of 96% African American, 3% Hispanic, 0.4% White. The gender makeup of the school is 47.5% male and 52.5% female. 77% of students were eligible for the Free Lunch Program.

Activities 
Thornridge is known for its success in the performing arts and competitive public speaking. The following teams have placed in the top four of their respective state championship competitions sponsored by the IHSA.

Debate: State Champions (1975–76); 2nd place (1972–73, 1977–78)
Drama: State Champions (1971–72, 1989–90, 2003–04, 2004–05, 2007–08);  2nd Place (1969–70, 1973–74, 1975–76, 1981–82, 1984–85, 1988–89, 2005–06); 3rd Place (1976–77, 1978–79, 1982–83);  4th Place (2001–02)
 Group Interpretation: State Champions (1974–75, 1993–94, 2002–03);  2nd Place (1980–81, 1997–98, 2000–01, 2003–04);  4th Place (1996–97, 1999–2000)
Individual Events: State Champions (1967–68, 1968–69, 1969–70, 1970–71); 3rd Place (1984–85, 1993–94); 4th Place (1964–65, 1980–81, 1982–83, 1989–90)
Speech: State Champions (1967–68, 1969–70); 2nd Place (1970–71, 1971–72), 4th Place (1968–69)

Athletics 
The Falcons compete in the Southland Athletic Conference (SAC) as well the state championship series sponsored by the Illinois High School Association (IHSA) which governs most athletic and competitive activities in Illinois. School colors are Columbia Blue and Navy. Teams are called the "Falcons".

The Athletic Director is Sherry Jackson and the Assistant Athletic Director is Prince Lowe.

The school sponsors interscholastic teams for both young men and women in basketball, cross country, soccer, tennis, bowling and track & field. Young men compete in baseball, football, swimming & diving, and wrestling. Young women compete in cheerleading, softball, and volleyball.

The following teams won or placed in the top four of their respective class in their respective sports in IHSA sponsored state championship series:

 Basketball (Boys): State Champions (1970–71, 1971–72); Regional Champions (1970-71, 1971-72, 1972-73, 1973-74, 1974-75, 1975-76, 1979-80, 1984-85, 1988-89, 1989-90, 1991-92, 1993-94, 1994-95, 1996-97, 1997-97, 1998-99, 2000-01, 2001-02, 2004-05, 2005-06); Sectional Champions (1970-71, 1971-72, 1975-76, 1988-89, 1991-92, 1998-99)
 Basketball (Girls): Regional Champions (1991-92, 1993-94, 1994-95)
 Baseball: Regional Champions (1967-68, 1974-75, 1978-79, 1979-80, 1981-82); Sectional Champions (1981-82)
 Bowling (Girls): Sectional Champions (1983-84, 1988-89)
 Cross Country (Boys): 3rd Place (1978–79, 1979–80); Regional Champions (1982-83, 2004-05, 2005-06); Sectional Champions (1978-79, 1979-80)
 Cross Country (Girls): 3rd Place (1983–84); Regional Champions (1982-83, 1983-84, 1984-85, 2005-06); Sectional Champions (1982-83, 1983-84)

 Football: State Champions (1969-70)* Conference Champions (1965-66, 1969-70, 1972-73, 1982-83)
 Soccer (Boys): Regional Champions (1988-89, 1994-95)
 Softball: Sectional Champions (1978-79, 1980-81)
 Tennis (Girls): Sectional Champions (1988-89, 1989-90)

 Track and Field (Boys): 3rd Place (1979–80); Sectional Champions (1983-84, 1993-94, 2012-13, 2018-19)
 Track and Field (Girls): Sectional Champions (1989-90, 1990-91, 2001-02)
 Swimming (Boys): 3rd place (1969–70); 4th Place (1966–67, 1967–68, 1968–69)
 Wrestling: Regional Champions (2005-06)

Notable alumni

 Quinn Buckner, a former NBA player who led Thornridge to 1971 and 1972 IHSA state basketball championships; was co-captain of the 1976 NCAA Tournament champion Indiana Hoosiers, later winning a title for the 1984 NBA champion Boston Celtics; was head coach for the Dallas Mavericks; and won a gold medal with the US National Basketball Team in the 1976 Summer Olympics;
David Clayton, a human rights activist who was named to the IHSA All-Star Cast for his performance in The Firebugs in 1972
Kevin Duckworth, a 2x All-Star NBA center (1986–97)
Nelsan Ellis (November 30, 1977 – July 8, 2017), an actor and playwright. He is best known for his role in series True Blood (2008–2014), for which he won a Satellite Award from the International Press Academy, among his other accolades.
Reggie Hayward, a former defensive end who played nine seasons in the National Football League (NFL) for the Denver Broncos and Jacksonville Jaguars
Syleena Johnson, a Grammy-nominated R&B singer and TV reality show star
Jane Lynch. an actress, comedian, and singer; is best known for starring as Sue Sylvester in television series Glee, as Calhoun in the series "Wreck-It Ralph" and in various Christopher Guest-directed films like A Mighty Wind, and Best in Show; host of TV's Hollywood Game Night
Sam Mack, a former NBA guard
LisaRaye McCoy, a film and television actress (The Players Club, Single Ladies)
Richard Roeper, a Chicago Sun-Times columnist and film critic who co-hosted At the Movies with Roger Ebert
Joe Skalski, former alumni of Thornridge High later attending Saint Xavier University, and drafted by the Cleveland Indians in the 3rd round of the 1986 MLB Draft, pitching for the organization until 1990.

References

External links
Thornridge High School

Public high schools in Cook County, Illinois